George Collier (1732–1795) was a Royal Navy officer.

George Collier may also refer to:

Sir George Collier, 1st Baronet (1774–1824), Royal Navy officer
Wash Collier (George Washington Collier, 1813–1903), early settler in the Atlanta area

See also
Collier (disambiguation)